Sparkling Rain: and other fiction from Japan of women who love women is an English-language anthology of short stories from Japanese lesbian or bisexual women, edited by Barbara Summerhawk and Kimberly Hughes. It also includes essays about the history of Japanese lesbian literature. The anthology does not include material on works with female same-sex eroticism or undertones by publicly heterosexual authors.

Contents
The Symbolic Tree of Lesbianism in Japan: An Overview of Lesbian Activist History and Literary Works by Sawabe Hitomi
Overview of Lesbian Literature in Japan by Watanabe Mieko 
Returning to Asukua (To Raichō) poem to Hiratsuka Raicho by Otake Kōkichi 
Yoshiya Nobuko: Gazing Upon the Female, essay by Komashaku Kimi on Yoshiya Nobuko
Monalisa Night by Izumo Marou
Junko's After School Project by Mori Natsuko
The Pink Drink by Narihara Akira
Lover by Tōgarashi
A Story of First Love by Uehara Chigusa
Night Footsteps: Paris, 249 Rue St. Denis by Asai Saho
High Praise for Plica-Chan by Mizoguchi Akiko
Plica-Chan (lesbian manga) by Amamiya Sae
Nobita's Friend (movie screenplay) by Desiree Lim
Explosions in a Faraway Sky by Shichi Hakku
The Soul Comes Back by Shirosaki Nagi
The Mistake by Barbara Summerhawk
Sparkling Rain by Nakayama Kaho

Reception
Japan Today noted its lack of "overt eroticism".  James Welker, writing in the journal Intersections, noted Summerhawk's use of the inclusive term "women who love women".  For Donald Richie, writing for The Japan Times, Sparkling Rain was the best of the stories in the anthology, being both "a moving account and at the same time an important document". Lavender magazine described the anthology as "groundbreaking", especially enjoying the non-fiction essays included in the anthology.

Reviews also appeared in the Okazu blog of yuri anime by Erica Friedman, and the NagaZasshi DIY culture magazine from Nagasaki (Vol. 1.4, page 13) by Crystal Uchino.

The anthology was nominated in the Lambda Literary Awards and won in the "Best Anthology" category of the Golden Crown Literary Society Literary Awards for 2009.

References

 
 http://nagazasshi.com/sites/all/files/NagaZasshi_Vol_1.4.pdf

2008 anthologies
2000s LGBT literature
Japanese anthologies
Lesbian culture in Asia
Lesbian fiction
LGBT anthologies
LGBT literature in Japan
Fiction anthologies